Aleksandr Krasavin (born 1929) is a Soviet sprint canoer who competed in the early 1950s. He was eliminated in the heats of the C-2 1000 m event at the 1952 Summer Olympics in Helsinki.

References
Aleksandr Krasavin's profile at Sports Reference.com

External links
  

1929 births
Canoeists at the 1952 Summer Olympics
Olympic canoeists of the Soviet Union
Possibly living people
Soviet male canoeists